Þrimilcemōnaþ (modern English: Three-Milkings Month) was the Anglo-Saxon name for the month of May.

The name was recorded by the Venerable Bede in his work De Temporibus (On Time) in about 703, and was so named because cows could apparently be milked three times in one day during this month. According to Bede:

See also

Germanic calendar
Anglo-Saxon
Old English

References

May
Old English